"I Might Even Quit Lovin' You" is a song co-written and recorded by American country music artist Mark Chesnutt.  It was released in March 1998 as the third single from the album Thank God for Believers.  The song reached #18 on the Billboard Hot Country Singles & Tracks chart.

Chart performance

Year-end charts

References

1998 singles
1997 songs
Mark Chesnutt songs
Songs written by Roger Springer
Songs written by Mark Chesnutt
Decca Records singles
Song recordings produced by Mark Wright (record producer)